Watchtower is an American progressive metal band based in Austin, Texas, active from 1982 to 1993 and they have reunited occasionally since 1999. The band has released two studio albums―Energetic Disassembly (1985) and Control and Resistance (1989)―as well as one compilation album, four digital singles, one EP and three demo cassettes, and has been featured on numerous compilation albums. They are also notable for featuring vocalist Jason McMaster, who left Watchtower after the release of Energetic Disassembly to form Dangerous Toys, and was replaced by Alan Tecchio, who appeared on Control and Resistance and the band's 2016 EP Concepts of Math: Book One.

Influenced by the progressive rock and then-burgeoning new wave of British heavy metal scenes, Watchtower has been credited (along with Voivod and Coroner) for helping pioneer the subgenre of "technical thrash metal" (also known as "progressive thrash metal"), which mixed elements of progressive music with thrash/speed metal. The band has also been cited as having influenced many notable progressive or heavy metal groups, including Dream Theater, Death, Annihilator, Coroner, Atheist, Pestilence, Cynic, Symphony X, Toxik, Sieges Even and Spiral Architect.

History

Initial career (1982–1993)
Watchtower was formed in May 1982 in Austin, Texas. The quartet made its recording debut in 1983 with an early version of the song "Meltdown", which was included on the Cottage Cheese from the Lips of Death - A Texas Hardcore Compilation LP. It was followed by the debut album, Energetic Disassembly, issued in 1985 on the band's own DIY label, Zombo Records. An earlier version of the album was scrapped after the group's label, Rainforest Records, closed its doors. Energetic Disassembly is notable for its heavy use of time changes and is considered to be a landmark in progressive metal, as well as the first album for crossing over the genres of progressive and thrash/speed metal, thus the creation of the subgenre known as technical thrash metal. The album saw Watchtower tour with bands such as Slayer, Anthrax, Helstar, Celtic Frost, Voivod and Armored Saint.

In the fall of 1986, guitarist and founding member, Billy White, quit the band in order to pursue different styles of music. He formed the short-lived Khymera with Juggernaut drummer Bobby Jarzombek and former Karion bassist Pete Perez before joining vocalist Don Dokken for the Up from the Ashes album in 1990. With Watchtower's future briefly in doubt, Doug Keyser auditioned for Metallica following the death of bassist Cliff Burton. Similarly, Jason McMaster was approached by fellow Texans Pantera in search of a new vocalist. McMaster eventually exited in 1988 after getting signed to a major label deal with his side project Onyxx, later renamed Dangerous Toys, whose self-titled debut album on CBS scored the MTV hits "Teas'n, Pleas'n" and "Scared" and reached near gold status.

White's replacement was Ron Jarzombek, formerly with S.A. Slayer, while fellow Austinite Mike Soliz (ex-Militia, Assalant) was recruited in place of McMaster, but eventually replaced by former Hades vocalist Alan Tecchio. Newly signed to Noise Records, Watchtower flew to Berlin, Germany in the summer of 1989 where the band recorded their second album, Control and Resistance, at Sky Trak Studios, which was released that November. Control and Resistance received positive reviews by the press and fans alike, and saw Watchtower mix their style with progressive metal, thrash metal and jazz fusion, thus creating a sound that would influence the technical death metal genre. In support of the album, the band opened for Coroner in Europe on their No More Color tour, and also played with Dark Angel, Loudblast, Tankard, Prong, Fates Warning, Mordred, and Whiplash.

After first and only European tour (opening for Noise Records labelmates Coroner) in the spring of 1990, Watchtower continued to promote Control and Resistance with a few East Coast shows but lost Tecchio soon thereafter. The remaining members of the band spent more than two years searching for a new vocalist, which proved to be a difficult task, although several candidates – including Scott Jeffries (Confessor) – were at least considered. Adding to the band's woes, Jarzombek developed severe hand problems which required multiple surgeries, effectively putting Watchtower on ice indefinitely and with it a proposed third album, which was to be titled Mathematics.

Split (1993–1999)
After failing to find a reliable replacement for vocalist Alan Tecchio, Watchtower finally disbanded around 1993, and the members went on to pursue their own individual activities. Bassist Doug Keyser and drummer Rick Colaluca joined colorful local rock/funk/rap outfit Retarted Elf who released the album Trick Quigger on Pony Canyon in Japan. Jarzombek returned with Spastic Ink, akin to an all-instrumental version of Watchtower, who issued their debut album, Ink Complete in 1997, while McMaster continued with Dangerous Toys before making Broken Teeth his main band in the late 1990s. Tecchio reunited with his former Hades bandmate Dan Lorenzo in the New Jersey-based heavy metal band Non-Fiction, which released three studio albums during the early-to-mid 1990s – about the same time the duo resurrected Hades, who remain active to this day despite no new recordings since their most recent album, 2001's DamNation.

Reunion with Jason McMaster (1999–2010)
In 1999, original Watchtower members McMaster, Keyser and Colaluca reunited, along with Jarzombek, to record a cover of Accept's "Run If You Can" for A Tribute to Accept - Vol. 1 on Nuclear Blast Records. In 2000, Watchtower played the prestigious Bang Your Head!!! festival in Germany and later that summer supported Dream Theater in Houston and Dallas. The band also began work on the long dormant Mathematics album, but progress stalled once again.

In 2002, Monster Records issued Demonstrations in Chaos, an archives release consisting of early recordings, demos, and unreleased tracks, including almost the complete original Energetic Disassembly recordings and the 1987 demos with Ron Jarzombek that got the band signed to Noise Records.

Watchtower returned to Europe once more in 2004 to headline the Headway Festival in Amstelveen, Holland. That same year Ron Jarzombek released the second Spastic Ink album, Ink Compatible, with guest contributions by Watchtower band mates Doug Keyser and Jason McMaster who contributed lead vocals on five songs. In the fall of 2004, Monster Records, now Monster Underground, re-issued Energetic Disassembly on CD for the first time ever in the United States. The original CD re-issue came 1993, courtesy of Germany's Institute of Art label.

In the spring of 2009, Watchtower were confirmed as co-headliners of the 13th edition of Germany's Keep It True Festival, set to take place in April 2010. The band also re-commenced work on Mathematics with a view toward a 2010 release.

Decibel Magazine featured Watchtower's Control and Resistance as part of their "Hall of Fame" series in their January 2010 issue.

Reunion with Alan Tecchio and Concepts of Math EPs (2010–present)
On April 9, 2010, Watchtower released a preliminary mix of "The Size of Matter" from their forthcoming album Mathematics as a digital-only single. It marked the band's first new music since Control and Resistance in 1989, featuring Jarzombek, Keyser, and Colaluca, with Alan Tecchio returning on vocals and replacing original frontman Jason McMaster for the second time in the band's history. In May 2010, Tecchio left Watchtower once again. After the announcement of Tecchio's departure. Watchtower's last public appearance was at the German Keep It True festival in 2010.

On October 7, 2016, the EP Concepts of Math: Book One was released by Prosthetic Records, featuring previously released tracks, and new track, "Mathematica Calculis". On October 21, Watchtower released three new songs from Mathematics, M-Theory Overture, Arguments Against Design and Technology Inaction, on iTunes and CD Baby. They reunited with Tecchio for the sessions of these tracks.

Nothing has been posted on their Facebook page since 2016 and their official website is currently defunct. Nevertheless, Control and Resistance was reissued by Music On Vinyl in July 2018.

After years of speculation regarding the current status of Watchtower, drummer Rick Colaluca confirmed in a statement on Facebook in July 2020 that the band had been on an indefinite hiatus, and stated it was "doubtful that [they would] ever reform, but not out of the question." Colaluca also revealed that the band had "discussions a few times over the past several years" about finishing their long-in-the works third album Mathematics, and added that "there are a couple of sticking points that we just can't seem to get past. We actually have a good bit of the remaining songs recorded to some degree."

In a May 2022 interview, Tecchio stated that, even though Watchtower are "not like an active band", they have "pretty much the material" for their next EP Concepts of Math: Book Two. He also revealed that he has "one song in particular that [he's] still working on".

Members
Current members
 Alan Tecchio - vocals (1989–1990, 2010, 2015–2016, 2022–present)
 Ron Jarzombek - guitar (1986–1993, 1999–2010, 2015–2016, 2022–present)
 Doug Keyser - bass (1982–1993, 1999–2010, 2015–2016, 2022–present)
 Rick Colaluca - drums (1982–1993, 1999–2010, 2015–2016, 2022–present)

Former members
 Jason McMaster - vocals (1982–1988, 1999–2009)
 Mike Soliz - vocals (1988–1989)
 Billy White - guitars (1982–1986)

Timeline

Discography

Studio albums
 Energetic Disassembly (Zombo Records, 1985 / Institute of Art, 1993/1997 / Monster Underground 2004 / Rockadrome, 2006)
 Control and Resistance (Noise International, 1989)

Compilation albums
 Metalliance Volume 1 (Hands Of Blue Records, 2015)
 Demonstrations in Chaos (Monster Records, 2002 / Rockadrome, 2006)
 Cottage Cheese from the Lips of Death (Ward-9, 1983 / Atila, 2001)
 Doomsday News 2 (Noise International, 1989)
 Doomsday News - The Video Compilation Volume 2 (Noise International, 1990)
 12 Years in Noise: Metal & Beyond [2-CD] (Noise Records, 1996)
 A Tribute to Accept Vol. 1 (Nuclear Blast, 1999)

EPs and singles
 "The Size of Matter" (digital single, 2010)
 "Arguments Against Design" (digital single, 2015)
 "M-Theory Overture" (digital single, 2015)
 "Technology Inaction" (digital single, 2015)
 Concepts of Math: Book One (Prosthetic Records, 2016)
 Concepts of Math: Book Two (TBA)

Demos
 Meltdown (1984)
 Demo 1987 (1987)
 Instruments of Random Murder (1987)

References

External links
 Official website
 Official Watchtower message board
 Watchtower On YouTube
 Watchtower On Last.fm
 Watchtower On RateYourMusic.com

American progressive metal musical groups
American thrash metal musical groups
Heavy metal musical groups from Texas
Musical groups from Austin, Texas
Musical groups established in 1982
1982 establishments in Texas
Noise Records artists